A New Day can refer to:

Music
A New Day..., Céline Dion's 2003-07 Las Vegas show
A New Day... Live in Las Vegas, Céline Dion's 2004 album with the show
Live in Las Vegas: A New Day..., Dion's 2007 DVD with the show
A New Day (Luciano album), a 2001 album
A New Day (Four Letter Lie album), a 2009 album
WWE The Music: A New Day, Vol. 10, a 2010 album put out by World Wrestling Entertainment
"A New Day" (song), a 1984 song by Killing Joke
A New Day, a 2006 album by Sinamore
"A New Day", a song by The Olivia Tremor Control from the 1999 album Black Foliage: Animation Music Volume One
"A New Day", a 2007 song by Midnight Youth
"A New Day", the main theme of the 2005 video game Sonic Rush

Other
"A New Day" (The Wire), an episode of the television series The Wire
"A New Day" (The Walking Dead), an episode of Telltale Games' episodic video game

See also 
 A Nu Day, a 2000 album by Tamia
 New Day (disambiguation)